CBRY may refer to:

 Copper Basin Railway (reporting mark CBRY)
 CBRY-FM, a radio station (105.1 FM) licensed to Alert Bay, British Columbia, Canada